Antonio J. Shalfoon (born 10 August 1997) is a New Zealand rugby union player who plays for the Tasman Mako in the Bunnings NPC competition. His position of choice is Lock.

Bunnings NPC 
Shalfoon was named in the 2019  squad and played 6 games in the 2019 season. In 2020 he was named in the Tasman Mako squad for the 2020 Mitre 10 Cup. He missed the season with injury as the Mako went on to win their second premiership title in a row. Shalfoon made his debut for the side in Round 1 of the 2021 Bunnings NPC against , starting at number 5 in a 14-27 win for Tasman - while also becoming Mako number 200. In just his third match for Tasman Shalfoon captained the side against  at Trafalgar Park in a non competition match, the Mako coming away with the win 26–9.

References

External links
itsrugby.co.uk profile

New Zealand rugby union players
Living people
Waikato rugby union players
1997 births
People educated at Lincoln High School, New Zealand
Tasman rugby union players
Rugby union locks